The Boyd G.B.1 was a two-seat monoplane designed for homebuilt aircraft kit building from glass fibre parts.

Design and development
Gary Boyd designed and built his G.B.1 over two-year period from 1977. The first flight was made in December 1979 and by early 1981 more than 70 flying hours had been achieved.

The G.B.1 was a monoplane almost entirely built from pre-moulded glass fibre components bonded together with polyester resin; these components, together with plans, were available to amateur builders. This structural approach was intended to make construction simple and also allowed the easy removal of the outer wing panels for transport. The prototype had a 1.8 L Volkswagen engine and a retractable, tailwheel undercarriage but the plans offered a choice of Volkswagen air-cooled engine installations in the 1.6 – 2.2 L range, as well as alternative fixed conventional undercarriage and retractable tricycle gear.

Specifications (prototype)

References

External links
RAF 48 airfoil

Single-engine aircraft
1970s United States sport aircraft